Kedir is a surname. Notable people with the surname include:

Haile Micael Kedir (born 1944), Ethiopian cyclist
Mohamed Kedir (born 1954), Ethiopian runner
Muktar Kedir (fl. 1999–present), Ethiopian politician

See also
Keir

Surnames of African origin